A diamond jubilee celebrates the 60th anniversary of a significant event related to a person (e.g. accession to the throne or wedding, among others) or the 60th anniversary of an institution's founding. The term is also used for 75th anniversaries, although the human lifespan makes this usage more common for institutions.

Western monarchies 
 
George III of the United Kingdom died a few months before his diamond jubilee was due in 1820. The Diamond Jubilee of Queen Victoria celebrated her 60-year reign on 22 June 1897. The Diamond Jubilee of Elizabeth II, the Queen, was celebrated across the Commonwealth of Nations throughout 2012. Her platinum jubilee was marked in February 2022 and celebrated throughout the United Kingdom in June.

Asian monarchies 

In East Asia, the diamond jubilee coincides with the traditional 60-year sexagenary cycle, which is held in special importance despite not generally being called a "diamond jubilee." Monarchs such as the Kangxi and Qianlong emperors of China and Emperor Hirohito of Japan held celebrations for their 60th year of reign, as did King Bhumibol Adulyadej of Thailand on 10 June 2006.

National governments also mark their 60th anniversary as diamond jubilees, as did the Republic of Korea in 2005 and the People's Republic of China in 2009. In South Asia, the term is also used for certain 100-day anniversaries. In the Indian and Pakistani film industries, a "diamond jubilee" film is a title that has been featured in cinemas for 100 days, and beyond.

African monarchies 
The longest reigning monarch in history, Sobhuza II of Swaziland, celebrated his (60 year) diamond jubilee in 1981, dating from when he gained direct rule. There does not appear to have been any (75 year) diamond jubilee celebration.

List of diamond jubilees 

In 1984, the phrase "Diamond Jubilee" was used by Metro-Goldwyn-Mayer in its logo for the sixtieth anniversary of the studio.
In 2015 it marked Disneyland Park's Diamond Jubilee to celebrate 60 years.

See also 

 Hierarchy of precious substances
 List of longest-reigning monarchs
 Wedding anniversary

References 

Anniversaries